Decoy is an EP by the Santa Cruz, California-based hardcore punk band Good Riddance. It was released August 26, 1995 through Fat Wreck Chords, six months after their debut album For God and Country, which included the EP's title track, "Decoy". The first two tracks on the EP, "United Cigar" and "12 Year Circus", are taken from the album, while "Free" was previously unreleased. Singer Russ Rankin later remarked that he had written "Free" "as a vehicle with which to lyrically attack two of my favorite targets: pro-lifers and cops. I remember enjoying this song when we played it at shows and it was one of our most requested live songs for a little while after For God and Country came out and a whole slew of new fans bought the Decoy 7-inch after picking up the full length." Decoy was Good Riddance's final release with drummer Rich McDermott, who left the band and was replaced by Sean Sellers.

Track listing

Personnel

Band 
 Russ Rankin – vocals
 Luke Pabich – guitar
 Chuck Platt – bass guitar
 Rich McDermott – drums

Production 
 Steve Papoutsis – recording engineer

References

External links 
Decoy at Fat Wreck Chords

Good Riddance (band) EPs
1995 EPs
Fat Wreck Chords EPs